Waggeryds IK is a sports club in Vaggeryd, Sweden, established in April 1920. The club runs bandy and association football teams. Anton Lindbergh was chairman for the first 38 years of the club. The men's bandy team played in the Swedish top division in 1942. and 1963–1964. and played in the qualifying rounds for the Swedish top division in 1970.

References

External links
Official website 

1920 establishments in Sweden
Bandy clubs in Sweden
Football clubs in Jönköping County
Sport in Jönköping County
Association football clubs established in 1920
Bandy clubs established in 1920